Slamniki is a small settlement above Bohinjska Bela in the Municipality of Bled in the Upper Carniola region of Slovenia.

References

External links
Slamniki at Geopedia

Populated places in the Municipality of Bled

sl:Selo pri Bledu